The Shadow Cabinet is the fourth full-length album by Danish band Wuthering Heights. It has been received with great reviews, and is considered "the best symphonic metal record of 2006".

Track listing
All songs written by Erik Ravn.
 Demon Desire - 05:18
 Beautifool - 05:02
 The Raven - 04:47
 Apathy Divine (Part 1: Faith) - 08:19
 Envy - 06:41
 Apathy Divine (Part 2: Snow) - 05:55
 Sleep - 04:45
 I Shall Not Yield - 06:40
 Reason...? - 00:31
 Carpe Noctem - Seize the Night - 07:38

Personnel
Erik Ravn – guitar, keyboards, vocals
Andreas Lindahl – keyboards
Martin Arendal – guitar
Morten Sørensen – drums
Nils Patrik Johansson – vocals
Teddy Möller - bass

References

Wuthering Heights (band) albums
2006 albums